Avishan Bagheri was born in 1998 in Bandar Anzali. She started with Karate from the age of four under the supervision of her father (Mustafa Bagheri) and she is active in the Shitorio style.

Medals
She has one world gold medal, two Asian gold and one silver medal, and two world and Asian student silver medals.

She won a gold medal at the 2012 World Youth Karate League in Turkey.

She won a gold medal at the 2013 Asian Youth Karate Championships in the UAE.

At the 2014 International Youth Karate Championships in Thailand, she won a gold medal.

She won a silver medal at the 2014 Asian Youth Karate Championships in Malaysia.

At the 2017 Asian Hope Karate Championships in Kazakhstan, she won the gold medal.

At the 2017 World Hope Karate Championships in Spain, she stood on the championship podium.

She won second place in the 2018 World Adult Karate Competition held in Japan.

She won a bronze medal at the 2019 Asian Student Karate Championships in Macau.

References 

Iranian female karateka
Living people
1998 births
People from Bandar-e Anzali
Sportspeople from Gilan province
21st-century Iranian women